The North Fork Feather River is a watercourse of the northern Sierra Nevada and southern Cascades in the U.S. state of California. It flows generally southwards from its headwaters near Lassen Peak to Lake Oroville, a reservoir formed by Oroville Dam in the foothills of the Sierra, where it runs into the Feather River. By discharge, it is the largest tributary of the Feather.

It rises at the confluence of Rice Creek and a smaller unnamed stream in the southern part of the Lassen Volcanic National Park. The river flows east, receiving Warner Creek from the left, and passes the town of Chester. It then empties into Lake Almanor, which is formed by the Canyon Dam. After leaving the dam the river cuts south into a gorge, and turns southwest to receive Butt Creek from the right. The East Branch North Fork Feather River, the North Fork's largest tributary, comes in next to Caribou Rd (40°00'49.9"N 121°13'32.4"W). It then flows southwards, through several hydroelectric dams, into the north arm of Lake Oroville.

The fork's portion of the Feather River Canyon is notable as part of the Feather River Route, and the railroad's North Fork Bridge near the river's mouth is the longest reinforced concrete bridge in the US.

The North Fork is heavily developed for hydroelectricity generation and is impounded by five dams, as part of three hydroelectric projects – the Upper North Fork Feather River Project, the Rock Creek-Cresta Hydroelectric Project and the Poe Hydroelectric Project. The system is so extensive that it has been dubbed the "Stairway of Power".

Watershed
The North Fork Feather Watershed (USGS Huc 18020121) extends from the North Fork headwaters south-southwest to the Lower Feather Watershed. The headwaters are in the Shasta Cascades and the northern Sierras along the Pit River and Eagle-Honey watersheds.  The drainage divide for the headwaters begins in Shasta County at the Lassen Peak quadruple watershed point of East Sulpher Creek (Mill-Big Chico), Manzanita Creek (Upper Cow-Battle watershed), Lost Creek (Lower Pit River), and Kings Creek (North Fork Feather).  The headwater divide extends in an arc east to Lassen County, then to the Great Basin Divide triple point of the Feather, Pit, and Susan Rivers.  The divide arcs southeast to Pegleg Mountain and along  of the Sierra Crest to the triple point with the East Branch North Fork Feather River on the east slope of Indicator Peak.  Downstream of Shasta and Lassen counties, the majority of the North Fork Feather Watershed area is in Plumas County.  The west divide of the watershed is along the Mill-Big Chico Watershed, southward to the West Branch Feather River triple point.  The southeast divide of the North Fork Feather Watershed is the watershed of the East Branch to the triple point with the Middle Fork Feather River.

References

Tributaries of the Feather River
Rivers of Plumas County, California
Rivers of the Sierra Nevada (United States)
Feather Headwaters
Rivers of Northern California
Rivers of the Sierra Nevada in California